Billpoint was the name of a person-to-person money transfer service founded in 1998, and purchased in 1999 by online auctioneer eBay.

History 
Billpoint was founded in 1998 by S. Young Lee, Hope Chen, Will Chen, Jason May, Ian Flint and Jay Shen, with headquarters in Redwood City, California. The company obtained venture funding from Sequoia Capital in February 1999, and later that year was purchased by eBay; its website was taken offline while integration into eBay's auction service took place. It reappeared in 2000 when it was relaunched as a joint venture with Wells Fargo bank.

During this interval, online payment service PayPal was launched, rapidly becoming popular with eBay's customers. Billpoint and eBay spent much of the next two years trying to overtake PayPal, but with mixed results. 

In July 2002, eBay CEO Meg Whitman agreed to the acquisition of PayPal with its CEO Peter Thiel.  When the deal was closed in October 2002, eBay began the process of phasing out Billpoint.  The shutdown was completed in early 2003.

References 

EBay
Financial services companies established in 1998
Financial services companies disestablished in 2003
Online financial services companies of the United States
Payment service providers
1999 mergers and acquisitions
Defunct financial services companies of the United States